HMS Walker (D27)  was a W-class destroyer of the British Royal Navy that saw service in the final months of World War I, in the Russian Civil War and in World War II.

Construction and commissioning
Walker was ordered on 9 December 1916; she was laid down by William Denny and Brothers at Dumbarton, Scotland, on 26 March 1917. She was launched on 29 November, completed on 12 February 1918 – fitted to lay mines and commissioned on the same day. She was assigned the pennant number G22 in January 1918; it was changed to G09 in April 1918, and to D27 during the interwar period.

Service history

World War I
All of the V- and W-class destroyers, Walker among them, were assigned to the Grand Fleet or Harwich Force for the rest of World War I, which ended with the armistice with Germany on 11 November 1918.

Interwar
Walker took part in the British campaign against Bolshevik forces in the Baltic Sea during 1919, seeing action against Russian warships; from May 1919 she participated in a blockade of Bolshevik warships in Kronstadt and suffered two hits from the Bolshevik battleship  during an attempted breakout by the Bolshevik fleet. She was part of the 1st Destroyer Flotilla in the Atlantic Fleet from 1921 to 1930, and visited Helsinki in Finland, from 15 to 22 June 1926 when the flotilla made a cruise in the Baltic. She was decommissioned in 1932, transferred to the Reserve Fleet, and placed in reserve at Rosyth, Scotland.

In August 1939, Walker was recommissioned with a reserve crew to participate in the Royal Review of the Reserve Fleet by King George VI. She remained in commission after the review as the fleet mobilised in the face of rising tensions between the United Kingdom and Nazi Germany; proceeding to Plymouth to prepare for wartime service.

World War II

1939
When the United Kingdom entered World War II in early September 1939, Walker was assigned to the 11th Destroyer Flotilla at Plymouth for convoy defence and patrol duties in the Southwestern Approaches. On 9 September she and the destroyers  and  escorted Convoy OB 2. While returning to Plymouth after detaching from the convoy, Walker and Vanquisher collided, killing 14 men about 200 nautical miles (370 km) southwest of Cape Clear Island, Ireland, on 10 or 11 September 1939 (sources differ) with both ships suffering serious damage. Walkers First Lieutenant was compelled to shoot some of the injured who were trapped in the wreckage. She was able to proceed under her own power, but Vanquisher required a tow, so Walker embarked injured personnel from Vanquisher, proceeded to Plymouth and entered Devonport Dockyard for repairs on 14 September 1939. Her repairs were not complete until mid-November, when she rejoined her flotilla, while Vanquisher was not fully repaired until early January 1940.

1940
From 25 to 26 March, Walker, the destroyer leader , and the destroyers  and  escorted convoy Convoy OG 23 in the Southwestern Approaches during the first part of her voyage from the United Kingdom to Gibraltar until relieved by two French Navy warships.

Norway
On 8 April 1940, Walker was transferred to the Home Fleet at Scapa Flow in the Orkney Islands to support operations during the Norwegian Campaign, escorting British military convoys carrying troops and equipment to the Nordic country. She suffered slight damage during a German air attack on a convoy on 9 April 1940. She came under sustained German air attack on 30 April while evacuating Allied troops from Andalsnes and Molde, where she ferried troops from shore to the light cruiser  and destroyer  for passage to the United Kingdom. On 1 May 1940, she covered the final evacuation from Andalsnes, also under heavy German air attack.

During May 1940, Walkers pennant number was changed to I27. As the Norwegian Campaign ended in an Allied failure to halt the German conquest of that country, Walker became the last Allied ship to leave the Narvik area as she escorted the final Allied evacuation convoy from Norway, departing Harstad on 8 June 1940.

Walker made an unsuccessful counterattack against the German submarine  on 2 July 1940 after the U-boat torpedoed and sank the passenger ship  while Andora Star was carrying German and Italian prisoners of war to Canada with 1,676 people on board. The destroyer then returned to the United Kingdom and underwent repairs that lasted until September 1940. In October, she passed her post-repair acceptance trials and returned to convoy escort duties in the Western Approaches.

1941
On 5 February 1941, Walker became part of the 5th Escort Group as the flagship of its senior officer, Donald Macintyre, and continued with escort duties in the Western Approaches. In mid-March, she took part in the highly successful defence of Convoy HX 112. As part of the escort on 16 March, she rescued 38 survivors of the Canadian merchant ship J. B. White, which the German submarine  had torpedoed and sunk at  while attacking the convoy. On 17 March, she and the destroyer  counterattacked the German submarine  – commanded by one of the Kriegsmarines top submarine commanders, Kapitänleutnant Joachim Schepke – with depth charges while defending the convoy, forcing U-100 to the surface; Vanoc then rammed and sank U-100 at 03:18 hours at the approximate position , crushing Schepke to death with her bows while he stood on the submarines bridge. Thirty-seven other members of U-100s crew also died in the sinking; Walker took aboard her six survivors. While rescuing them, Walker detected U-99 – commanded by another top German submarine officer, Korvettenkapitän Otto Kretschmer – attempting another attack on HX 112, and used depth charges to force her to the surface, after which her crew abandoned ship and scuttled her with the loss of three men dead, at 03:43 or 03:48 hours (sources differ), at the approximate position . Walker rescued U-99s 40 survivors, among them Kretschmer, who spent the rest of the war as a prisoner-of-war. The loss of these two officers, as well as of another highly successful submarine commander, Korvettenkapitän Günther Prien, killed 10 days earlier in the loss of U-47 while attacking Convoy OB 293, was a major early blow to the German submarine force.

Walker remained on convoy escort duty in the Western Approaches for the remainder of 1941 and into 1942.

1942
From 12 to 15 January 1942, Walker joined Vanoc, Volunteer, and the destroyer  as the local escort of Convoy WS 15, consisting of 22 troopships bound – from the River Clyde in Scotland – for Suez, Egypt; Bombay, India and Singapore; during the first leg of her voyage in the Northwestern Approaches. On 21 February, the Home Fleet force detached to proceed independently to Gibraltar, but Walker, Verity and Witherington remained with WS 16 until 22 February, when the light cruiser  and destroyer  relieved them as escort and they detached.

Walker remained on convoy duty in the Western Approaches for the rest of 1942. Near the end of the year, the Royal Navy selected her for conversion into a Long-Range Escort.

1943
Walker was taken into dockyard hands on the River Thames in January 1943 for her conversion. Upon completion, she underwent post-conversion acceptance trials in May and having passed them, spent June in work-ups in preparation for her return to combat service. In July 1943, she was assigned to the 4th Escort Group for convoy defence duties in the Northwestern Approaches and North Atlantic, which she continued until the end of the year.

1944
In January 1944, Walker was transferred to the Home Fleet to escort Arctic convoys to and from the Soviet Union. On 2 March, the ship joined the same vessels as close escort for the returning Convoy RA 57, which came under attack by German submarines on 4 March and arrived at Loch Ewe, Scotland, on 10 March 1944.

Nea Hellas had to return to the United Kingdom with mechanical problems, but the other ships pushed on, arriving at the Kola Inlet on 23 April 1944. On 13 May, Walker embarked 13 United States Navy enlisted men for transportation to the United Kingdom and departed the Kola Inlet as part of the escort for Convoy RA 59 on its voyage to the United Kingdom. After experiencing very bad weather and two days of German submarine attacks, she detached from RA 59 on 3 May 1944.

The escort group spent the rest of May preparing for Neptune, then proceeded in early June to Milford Haven in Wales, where it joined Convoy E2B2Z – 32 troop transports carrying United States Army troops and equipment to reinforce the beachhead – on 4 June 1944. The convoy arrived at the invasion beaches on 8 June, two days after the initial assault. On 10 June, Walker began escorting convoys to the beachhead during the initial build-up period in Normandy.

Released from supporting the beachhead later in June, Walker returned to escort work in the North Atlantic. She continued this until October, when she was reassigned to the 8th Escort Group for another tour of duty escorting Arctic convoys. From 2 to 9 November she joined the same ships in providing the close escort for Convoy RA 61 during its trip from the Kola Inlet to Loch Ewe. The ship then resumed convoy escort work in the Northwestern Approaches, but in December 1944 returned to the Arctic run, joining Keppel, Westcott, and the sloops of the 8th Escort Group on 30 December 1944 as the close escort of Convoy JW 63 during its voyage to the Soviet Union.

1945
Convoy JW 63 arrived at the Kola Inlet on 8 January 1945 after an uneventful passage from the United Kingdom. From 11 to 23 January, Walker, Keppel, and Westcott provided the close escort for Convoy RA 63 during its voyage from the Kola Inlet to the Clyde, a passage made in very bad weather that allowed only slow progress.

Walker returned to Atlantic convoy duty in February 1945. In March, she was assigned to antisubmarine warfare operations and convoy defence in the waters around the British Isles, continuing in this role until the German surrender in early May.

Decommissioning and disposal
Walker did not deploy operationally after Germanys capitulation; the Royal Navy soon decommissioned her and placed her in reserve. She was sold on 15 March 1946 for scrap and was disposed of at Troon in Scotland.

Notes

Bibliography
 
 
 
 
 
 
 
 
 
 
 
 
 
 

 

V and W-class destroyers of the Royal Navy
Ships built on the River Clyde
1917 ships
World War I destroyers of the United Kingdom
World War II destroyers of the United Kingdom
Maritime incidents in September 1939